The Women's Volleyball tournament at the 2005 Mediterranean Games was held in Almería, Spain.

Teams

Group A

 
 
 

Group B

Squads

Preliminary round

Group A

Saturday June 25, 2005

Monday June 27, 2005

Wednesday June 29, 2005

Group B

Saturday June 25, 2005

Monday June 27, 2005

Wednesday June 29, 2005

Final round

Semi finals
Friday July 1, 2005

Finals
Friday July 1, 2005 — Classification Match (5th/6th place)

Saturday July 2, 2005 — Classification Match (Bronze-medal match)

Saturday July 2, 2005 — Classification Match (Gold-medal match)

Final ranking

Awards

See also
2005 Women's European Volleyball Championship

Volleyball at the 2005 Mediterranean Games